William Bullock Ives, PC, QC (November 17, 1841 – July 15, 1899) was a Canadian politician, who served in the House of Commons of Canada from 1878 to 1899. A member of the Conservative Party of Canada, he represented the electoral districts of Richmond—Wolfe from 1878 to 1891 and Sherbrooke from 1891 to 1899, and served as the President of the Privy Council and Minister of Trade and Commerce.

Prior to his election to the House of Commons, Ives worked as a lawyer and businessman in Sherbrooke, Quebec, and served on the town council and as mayor.

He died in Ottawa on July 15, 1899.

Electoral record

References

External links
 

1841 births
1899 deaths
Conservative Party of Canada (1867–1942) MPs
Members of the House of Commons of Canada from Quebec
Members of the King's Privy Council for Canada
Pre-Confederation Canadian businesspeople
19th-century King's Counsel
Lawyers in Quebec
Canadian lawyers
Canadian King's Counsel
Anglophone Quebec people
Canadian people of English descent
Mayors of Sherbrooke